Euzaleptus is a genus of harvestmen in the family Sclerosomatidae from South and Southeast Asia.

Species
 Euzaleptus minutus (With, 1903)
 Euzaleptus sarawakensis Roewer, 1911
 Euzaleptus pilosus 
 Euzaleptus muticus

References

Harvestmen
Harvestman genera